Pascal Janin (born 4 April 1956) is a French football coach and former player who played as a goalkeeper. He is the current head coach of Stade Malien in the Malien Première Division.

Career
He played as a goalkeeper for Ligue 1 and Ligue 2 sides Angers, Gueugnon, Monaco, Orléans, Abbeville, and Strasbourg.

Coaching career
He coached Brest before Strasbourg, where he replaced Gilbert Gress. He was initially the goalkeeping coach of the side, and then caretaker manager. He was later confirmed as full-time manager.

Two and a half year after his dismissal from Strasbourg, in November 2012, Janin was named as head coach of Malian club Stade Malien.

References

1956 births
Living people
French footballers
Angers SCO players
FC Gueugnon players
AS Monaco FC players
US Orléans players
RC Strasbourg Alsace players
Ligue 1 players
Ligue 2 players
French football managers
Stade Brestois 29 managers
RC Strasbourg Alsace managers
People from Saumur
SC Abbeville players
Association football goalkeepers
Sportspeople from Maine-et-Loire
Stade Malien managers
Footballers from Pays de la Loire